The Tooth is a distinctive rock outcrop on the eastern slopes of Mount Terror, Ross Island, at an elevation of about 1,400 metres. The feature lies 1 nautical mile (1.9 km) south-southeast of Tent Peak and is reported to resemble a fossilized shark's tooth. Descriptively named by a party of the New Zealand Geological Survey Antarctic Expedition (NZGSAE), 1958–59, working in eastern Ross Island.

Rock formations of the Ross Dependency
Nunataks of Ross Island